HMS Argus was a steamship that was built in Scotland in 1904 as a cutter and fishery protection ship for the His Majesty's Coast Guard, and later served in the Royal Navy as HMS Argon. After the First World War she was converted into a passenger ferry, serving first the Isles of Scilly as Peninnis and then in the Channel Islands as Riduna. She was scrapped in England in 1932.

Building
Bow, McLachlan and Company built Argus in Paisley, Renfrewshire, launching her on 6 December 1904 and completing her in 1905.

Government service
After completion in 1905, Argus was delivered to Sheerness to replace the sailing cruisers Adder and Victoria. She was armed with two 6-pounder guns.

In 1905 she captured seven Dutch coopers inside the three-mile limit off the Humber. She seized 2¼ tonnes of tobacco and cigars that were being sold illegally to local fishermen.

In July 1909 she was off Hastings, under the command of Captain Hicks RN, watching the interests of British fishermen and keeping a look out for French boats within the three mile radius.

In 1917 Argus was commissioned into the Royal Navy as HMS Argon.

Passenger ferry
Argon was decommissioned from the Royal Navy, and in 1920 she was bought a William H Ward of Woodford, Essex. Ward sold her on to the Isles of Scilly Steamship Company for £8,000, refitted for £5,000 and renamed RMS Peninnis. She ran between Penzance and the Isles of Scilly until 1926, when the purpose-built  replaced her.

In 1927 the Alderney Steam Packet Company bought the ship and renamed her Riduna. In 1931 she was sold for scrap in Plymouth to William Hubert Davies, who broker her up in Plymouth in 1932.

Notes

References

Bibliography

1904 ships
Ferries of Guernsey
Ferries of the United Kingdom
Ships of the Royal Navy
Transport in the Isles of Scilly
Steamships of the United Kingdom